Frankie Fitzgerald (born 28 April 1985, in South London) is an English actor, best known for his role as Nick Cotton's son Ashley in the BBC soap opera EastEnders.

Career
Fitzgerald trained at The Webber Douglas Academy of Performing Arts, completing his three-year course in 2006. His career started much earlier, however, when he landed his first professional role at the age of 15. He played Ashley Cotton in EastEnders from 2000 to 2001 and since has appeared as Jason Porter, the main character of the final series of the drama Dream Team on Sky1.

In late 2008, Fitzgerald appeared in ITV1's He Kills Coppers. He appeared as a talking head on the 30 December 2008 episode of EastEnders Revealed: Nick Cotton Returns. He appeared in Casualty as Russell, and in Troy, where he played Aeneas. He also appeared in Holby City.

Partial filmography
Troy (2004) - Aeneas
Stormhouse (2011) - Dan Randall
London Irish(2013) - Tyson
Legend (2015) - Jack Dickson
Gangsters Gamblers Geezers (2016) - Dermot
EastEnders (2000-2001) - Ashley Cotton

External links
 

1985 births
Male actors from London
Living people
English male soap opera actors